John Wesley "Snake" Deal (January 21, 1879 – May 9, 1944) was a Major League Baseball first baseman.

He also played professional basketball in the National Basketball League. He is the earliest recorded player to make use of the jump shot.

References

Major League Baseball first basemen
Cincinnati Reds players
Minor league baseball managers
Chester (minor league baseball) players
Reading (minor league baseball) players
Holyoke Paperweights players
Lancaster Red Roses players
Buffalo Bisons (minor league) players
Montreal Royals players
Toronto Maple Leafs (International League) players
Syracuse Stars (minor league baseball) players
Wilkes-Barre Barons (baseball) players
Ridgway (minor league baseball) players
Baseball players from Pennsylvania
Sportspeople from Lancaster, Pennsylvania
1879 births
1944 deaths
Gettysburg Patriots players